Macrosaccus uhlerella is a moth of the family Gracillariidae. It is known from Illinois, Missouri, New York, Colorado and Texas in the United States.

The wingspan is 6-6.5 mm.

The larvae feed on Amorpha species (including Amorpha fruticosa) and Robinia species. They mine the leaves of their host plant. The mature mine is an elongate-oval, whitish blotch located on the underside of the leaf usually near the edge of the leaflet. Eventually, as the mine becomes tentiform, the leaf edge is slightly curled.

Gallery

References

External links
Macrosaccus at microleps.org

Lithocolletinae

Moths of North America
Lepidoptera of the United States
Moths described in 1859
Taxa named by Asa Fitch
Leaf miners